The Clay County School District was a public school district based in Clay County, Mississippi (USA). An elementary-only district, it was the smallest school district in the state of Mississippi, with a total student enrollment of 173 during the 2006-2007 school year. 

Effective July 1, 2015 it was consolidated into the West Point Consolidated School District.

Schools
West Clay Elementary School (Cedarbluff; Grades K-6)

Demographics

2006-07 school year
There were a total of 173 students enrolled in the Clay County School District during the 2006-2007 school year. The gender makeup of the district was 42% female and 58% male. The racial makeup of the district was 92.49% African American, 5.78% White, and 1.73% Hispanic. 91.2% of the district's students were eligible to receive free lunch.

Previous school years

Accountability statistics

See also
List of school districts in Mississippi

References

External links

Map of school districts in Clay County, MS in 2010 - U.S. Census Bureau

Education in Clay County, Mississippi
Former school districts in Mississippi
2015 disestablishments in Mississippi
School districts disestablished in 2015